During the 1995–96 English football season, Nottingham Forest competed in the FA Premier League.

Season summary
Nottingham Forest didn't know  what to expect following the sale of star striker Stan Collymore to Liverpool, but they performed reasonably well throughout the season and were comfortably in the top half. They were unbeaten in their first 12 league games, although they drew too many games to be considered serious title challengers, before they ran into a 7–0 defeat at Blackburn Rovers, who had just signed Forest midfielder Lars Bohinen.

The biggest success of the season was Forest's UEFA Cup exploits. In arguably the worst season for English clubs in European competitions in the era of three European trophies, they were the only English side with European action to look forward to after Christmas, and in March their adventure resumed with the first leg of the quarter-final – against Bayern Munich at the Olympiastadion. Forest lost 2–1, and any remaining hopes of a semi-final place were crushed in the second leg when the Bavarians thrashed Frank Clark's men 5–1 at the City Ground.

A ninth-place finish in the final table was not quite enough to secure another European campaign, and Clark's big summer signing, Dean Saunders, was captured in hope that he could be the man to score the goals which would bring more success to the club.

Final league table

Results summary

Results by round

Results
Nottingham Forest's score comes first

Legend

FA Premier League

FA Cup

League Cup

UEFA Cup

Squad

Left club during season

Reserve squad

Transfers

In

Out

Transfers in:  £7,425,000
Transfers out:  £10,000,000
Total spending:  £2,575,000

Statistics

Starting 11
Only considering appearances in Premier League and League Cup

References

Nottingham Forest F.C. seasons
Nottingham Forest F.C.